Corades enyo, the Enyo satyr, is a species of butterfly found in the high elevations of the Andes in Colombia and Peru. They belong to subtribe Pronophilina of the subfamily Satyrinae. The caterpillars grow on Chusquea species of bamboo.

Subspecies 
 Corades enyo enyo (northern Venezuela)
 Corades enyo almo Thieme, 1907 (Bolivia, Peru, Colombia, Venezuela, Ecuador)

References 

Satyrini
Nymphalidae of South America
Endemic fauna of Colombia
Butterflies described in 1849